Hannelore Baron (June 8, 1926 – April 28, 1987) was an artist who created highly personal, book-sized, abstract collages and box constructions, and exhibited in the late 1960s.

Biography
Born in Dillingen/Saar, Germany, Baron and her family fled persecution in Nazi Germany, illegally crossing the border into Luxembourg in 1939. In 1941 Baron's family sailed from Lisbon to New York and settled in the Bronx, New York City.  By the time she graduated from the Staubenmiller Textile High School in Manhattan, Baron was reading eastern philosophy, making increasingly abstract paintings and probably already experiencing the symptoms of claustrophobia and depression that would lead to a series of nervous breakdowns throughout her life.  She married book dealer Herman Baron in 1950 with whom she had daughter Julie and son Mark. In the late 1950s Baron combined a variety of techniques and began making her first collages.  Occupied with raising her two children and beset by psychological problems, Baron nevertheless exhibited her work and in 1969, the year of her one-person exhibition at Ulster County Community College, she began to make the box constructions that would become her signature.  In the early 1970s, Baron established a studio and devoted her time and energy completely to her artwork until her death in 1987. Hannelore Baron was self-taught.

Although her compositions are completely abstract, she considered them to be both personal and political statements. In her own words,

Everything I’ve done is a statement on the, as they say, human condition...the way other people march to Washington, or set themselves on fire, or write protest letters, or go to assassinate someone.  Well, I’ve had all the same feelings that these people had about various things, and my way out, because of my inability to do anything else for various reasons, has been to make the protest through my artwork... H.B.					

Throughout the 1970s and 1980s her work garnered critical acclaim, along with gallery and museum exhibitions in the United States, Europe and Japan.  In 1995, her work was the subject of a one-person exhibition at the Solomon R. Guggenheim Museum in New York. In 2001 her work was the subject of a traveling exhibition curated by Ingrid Schaffner and organized by the Smithsonian Institution Traveling Exhibition Service.  Her works can be found in the collections of The Museum of Modern Art, New York; the Solomon R. Guggenheim Museum, New York; the Whitney Museum of American Art, New York; the Los Angeles County Museum of Art, The Art Institute of Chicago, the San Francisco Museum of Modern Art, the Museum of Fine Arts, Boston, the Minneapolis Institute of Art and the Israel Museum, Jerusalem.

Works

Selected Public Collections
Albright-Knox Art Gallery, Buffalo, New York
The Art Institute of Chicago, Chicago, Illinois
Bass Museum, Miami, Florida
The Brooklyn Museum, Brooklyn, New York
The Chrysler Museum, Norfolk, Virginia
Solomon R. Guggenheim Museum, New York City
Hammer Museum, Los Angeles, California
Hudson River Museum, Yonkers, New York
Israel Museum, Jerusalem, Israel
The Jewish Museum, New York City
Kunstsammlung der Stadt Reutlingen, Reutlingen, Germany
St. Lawrence University, Canton, New York
Los Angeles County Museum of Art, Los Angeles, California
Milwaukee Art Museum, Milwaukee, Wisconsin
Minneapolis Institute of Art, Minneapolis, Minnesota
Modern Galerie des Saarland Museums, Saarbrücken, Germany
The Museum of Modern Art, New York City
The Boston Museum of Fine Arts, Boston, Massachusetts
The Smithsonian American Art Museum, Washington, D.C.
The New York Public Library, New York City
Racine Art Museum, Racine, Wisconsin
San Francisco Museum of Modern Art, San Francisco, California
Santa Barbara Museum of Art, Santa Barbara, California
Skirball Museum and Cultural Center, Los Angeles, California
Ulster County Community College, Stone Ridge, New York

References

Further reading
Frederic Koeppel, essay, Hannelore Baron Fragments Shored Against Ruins, Art Museum of the University of Memphis, 2002
Ingrid Schaffner, Hannelore Baron Works from 1969 to 1987, Smithsonian Institution, 2001
Ingrid Schaffner and Matthias Winzen, Deep Storage: Collecting, Storing, and Archiving in Art, P.S. 1 Contemporary Art Center, New York, 1998

External links
 Michael Rosenfeld Gallery
 Estate of Hannelore Baron

1926 births
1987 deaths
People from Dillingen (district)
German emigrants to the United States
People from the Bronx
20th-century American artists
20th-century American women artists